¡Allá tú! (Spanish for "It's Your Business") is the Spanish version of Deal or No Deal. It was initially broadcast by Telecinco between 2004 and 2008 and later changed to sister channel Cuatro for a comeback in 2011.

The top prize is €300,000 (US$321,585). It had been €600,000 (US$643,170) for a while due to a new text game where the money the contestant wins is split evenly between the contestant and the text winner (so if the contestant wins €600,000, he or she will win €300,000 and the text player will also receive €300,000). In 2006, there was a special called La Noche de los 2.000.000€ (The night of the 2 million euro), but the top prize was €1,000,000 (US$1,071,950) and the game was played twice on that night, the set was different as well (similar to the US version). In the 850th episode, the grand prize was increased to €850,000 (US$911,157).

It's hosted by Jesús Vázquez, but during Jesús's break to focus on another Endemol show, Operación Triunfo, Silvia Jato and later Arturo Valls filled in for him.

The first version of the show was broadcast on Antena 3 and called Una vez en la vida, hosted by Constantino Romero. It had a top prize of 210 000 000 ₧ (€1,262,125.42), and was based on the original German version, Die Chance deines Lebens.

This version of the show is very similar to the Italian version, Affari Tuoi. As in the UK, contestants open 22 boxes (though, unlike the UK, this is to represent one player from each region), rather than 26 briefcases (except for the million euro special, which actually had 26 briefcases).

On June 19, 2007, Gilbert from Tarragona became the first €600,000 winner.

On July 25, 2011, Maria del Carmen Bonilla from Asturias won €300,000 and becomes the second top prize winner.

Gameplay

2001 format (Una vez en la vida) 
The show featured 1,000 contestants packed into an arena, who would play a series of quiz minigames for the chance to play the final round, where they would have the chance to win 210 000 000 ₧ by answering a series of seven questions; any mistakes would subtract from the cash prize.

2006 format (¡Allá tú!) 
The program begins by each contestant being described by name and region (usually the newest contestant to replace the one who played last episode receives a special presentation), and then they answer a qualifying question, usually about statistics (i.e. "What percentage of the Spanish elderly have used the Internet? 1: 6%, 2: 26%, 3: 69%"). Out of those who answered correctly, one is drawn, who proceeds to the podium.

Before the game begins, the contestant picks one of the 22 boxes (26 cases for special episodes). Each box contains a different amount of money, from €0.10 to €300,000.

In the main game, the contestant's objective is to find out what their box contains by removing the boxes of the other 21 contestants (or 25 for specials): when each box is selected, the card with the box's value on is shown to the camera before the value of the card is out of play, and the display shows the amounts remaining.

At various points in the game, La Banca (The Banker) makes a phone call to the host and makes the contestant a cash offer to purchase their box and for the contestant to quit the game based on the value of the boxes left. The contestant can then decide whether to accept or decline the offer (unlike most versions the contestant does not have to open or shield a button).

In the first round the contestant opens five boxes, four in the second, three in the third and then two each in the fourth, fifth, sixth and seventh.

One player plays for the entire episode (except for the million-euro specials, which were longer and featured two players per episode). When their episode finishes, a new contestant replaces them in the wings.

In 2005, the money values were modified slightly, and the top prize was increased to €600,000 (though the contestant's winnings were split with a phone-in contestant and taxed).

Box/Case Values 
NOTE: Some small values were often replaced with joke prizes (except for the million euro specials).

In 2011, Box 23 ("The Green Box") could contain one of the following amounts:

References 

Spanish game shows
Deal or No Deal
Telecinco original programming
2004 Spanish television series debuts
2008 Spanish television series endings
2011 Spanish television series debuts
2011 Spanish television series endings
2000s Spanish television series
2010s Spanish television series